Lukas Grill (born 9 February 1993) is a German former professional footballer who plays as a defender.

External links
 

1993 births
Living people
German footballers
Association football central defenders
Regionalliga players
Allsvenskan players
FC Bayern Munich II players
Mjällby AIF players
German expatriate footballers
German expatriate sportspeople in Sweden
Expatriate footballers in Sweden